The R. G. Shepard Plantation was a small cotton plantation of  located in south central Leon County, Florida, United States established by R.G. Shepard.

Location
The R.G. Shepard Plantation bordered Southwood Plantation on the west side. Also nearby and to the northeast would have been the Joseph Chaires Plantation as well as George Taliaferro Ward's Clifford Place Plantation, Waverly Plantation, and Southwood Plantation.

Today that land encompasses part of Tram Road in the general area of an incorporated community called Corey southeast of Southwood Golf Club and northeast of Woodville.

Plantation specifics
The Leon County Florida 1860 Agricultural Census shows that the R. G. Shepard Plantation had the following:
 Improved Land: 
 Unimproved Land: 
 Cash value of plantation: $24,000
 Cash value of farm implements/machinery: $2000
 Cash value of farm animals: $7000
 Number of persons enslaved: 90
 Bushels of corn: 1000
 Bales of cotton: 225

References
Rootsweb Plantations
Largest Slaveholders from 1860 Slave Census Schedules
Paisley, Clifton; From Cotton To Quail, University of Florida Press, c1968.

Plantations in Leon County, Florida
Cotton plantations in Florida